The 2009 Royal Bank of Scotland Challenger was a professional tennis tournament played on outdoor hard courts. It was the third edition of the tournament which was part of the 2009 ATP Challenger Tour. It took place in Tiburon, California, United States between 12 and 18 October 2009. It was part of the Tiburon Challenger series.

ATP entrants

Seeds

 Rankings are as of October 5, 2009.

Other entrants
The following players received wildcards into the singles main draw:
  Lester Cook
  Jan-Michael Gambill
  Bradley Klahn
  Greg Ouellette

The following players received entry from the qualifying draw:
  Nick Lindahl
  Igor Sijsling
  Louk Sorensen
  Izak van der Merwe
  Artem Sitak (as a Lucky loser)

Champions

Singles

 Go Soeda def.  Ilija Bozoljac, 3–6, 6–3, 6–2

Doubles

 Treat Conrad Huey /  Harsh Mankad def.  Ilija Bozoljac /  Dušan Vemić, 6–4, 6–4

External links
USTA Website: Northern California
ITF Search 
2009 Draws

2009 ATP Challenger Tour
2009
2009 in American tennis
2009 in sports in California